Debre Bizen  is an Eritrean Orthodox Tewahedo Church monastery.  Located at the top of Debre Bizen the mountain (2460 meters) near the town of Nefasit in Eritrea. Its library contains many important Ge'ez manuscripts.

History

Debre Bizen was founded in the 1350s by Filipos, who was a student of Absadi. By 1400, the Monastery followed the rule of the House of Ewostatewos ( Eustáthios), and a gadl (hagiography) of Ewostatewos was later composed there. According to Tom Killion, it remained independent of the Ethiopian Church, while Richard Pankhurst states that it continued to be dependent on the Ethiopian Orthodox Tewahedo Church centered in Axum. In either case, a charter survives of the Emperor Zara Yaqob in which he granted lands to Debre Bizen.

The monastery was one of several habitations damaged by the Ottoman Empire in their campaigns to establish their province of Habesh Eyalet in the 16th century.

When Abuna Yohannes XIV, who came from Cairo to Ethiopia to serve as head of the Ethiopian Church, was held for ransom at Arkiko by the local naib, the abbot of Debre Bizen helped him to escape.

See also
 List of Eritrean Orthodox monasteries

References

Further reading 
 Roger Schneider, "Notes sur Filpos de Dabra Bizan et ses successeurs", Annales d'Ethiopie, 11 (1978), pp. 135-139

Christian monasteries established in the 14th century
Eritrean Orthodox monasteries
Religious organizations established in the 1350s
Northern Red Sea Region
Oriental Orthodox monasteries in Eritrea